In physical knot theory, each realization of a link or knot has an associated ropelength. Intuitively this is the minimal length of an ideally flexible rope that is needed to tie a given link, or knot. Knots and links that minimize ropelength are called ideal knots and ideal links respectively.

Definition 

Ropelength can be turned into a knot invariant by defining the ropelength of a knot  to be the minimum ropelength over all curves that realize .

Ropelength minimizers 
One of the earliest knot theory questions was posed in the following terms:

In terms of ropelength, this asks if there is a knot with ropelength .  The answer is no: an argument using quadrisecants shows that the ropelength of any nontrivial knot has to be at least . However, the search for the answer has spurred research on both theoretical and computational ground. It has been shown that for each link type there is a ropelength minimizer although it may only be of differentiability class . For the simplest nontrivial knot, the trefoil knot, computer simulations have shown that its minimum ropelength is at most 16.372.

Dependence on crossing number 
An extensive search has been devoted to showing relations between ropelength and other knot invariants such as the crossing number of a knot. There exist knots and links, namely the  torus knots and -Hopf links, for which this lower bound is tight. That is, for these knots (in big O notation),

On the other hand, there also exist knots whose ropelength is larger, proportional to the crossing number itself rather than to a smaller power of it. This is nearly tight, as for every knot,

The proof of this near-linear upper bound uses a divide-and-conquer argument to show that minimum projections of knots can be embedded as planar graphs in the cubic lattice. However, no one has yet observed a knot family with super-linear dependence of length on crossing number and it is conjectured that the tight upper bound should be linear.

References

Knot invariants
Geometric topology